Tiffany Crystal Houghton (born December 6, 1993) is an American singer-songwriter who is from and resides in Dallas. As a pop artist, she has released several singles. In 2014, she toured with the musical act MKTO. As a child and young teenager, Houghton lived in New York City, had some work in television and commercials, and was the alternate child actor and singer for the musical Annie. She was inspired by singer Kristin Chenoweth who visited her school. At seventeen, she moved to the country music city, Nashville, to gain experience, make connections, and work on her act.

In 2018, Houghton released the single "Pretty Pretty" in advance of a promised new album.

On March 23, 2019 Houghton married Adam Moffitt at the Dallas Texas Temple. The couple had their wedding reception at the Ritz Carlton in Dallas.

Tiffany Houghton (EP) 
In 2012, Houghton released her first, self-titled, Ep, Tiffany Houghton. Houghton has since removed the county album from all streaming platforms. The Ep featured the songs, Only One, Hundred & One, Like He Treats Her, Different, If You Won't Hold Me, and Make Me Stay.

Journalism 
In 2013 Houghton released her first album, Journalism. Like Tiffany Houghton (EP) the album has since been removed from all streaming platforms. The album features 8 songs and no music videos.

This Is Not An EP 
On December 1, 2014 Houghton released her first studio EP with songs Love Like That, Phone Call, Blame It On The Snow, The Best, High, and (Bonus Track) Island. Shortly after its release, High became Houghton's most successful hit acquiring over one million streams on YouTube alone.

Catch Me If You Can 
Only a few months after the release of This Is Not An EP, Houghton released her second EP, Catch Me If You Can. The Ep featured the songs Unstoppable, Band Boy, Go Love Yourself, Catch Me If You Can, Clueless, and Therapy.

Being the first single from the album, Houghton released "Catch Me If You Can" exclusively on Radio Disney. Within 24 hours, the song peaked at #1 and was the most requested song of the day and held that position for a while.

Singles 
Even though Houghton has released the majority of her tracks on albums or EPs, there have been a few songs to slip though the cracks and remain singles.

Slumber Party 
On April 16, 2021 Houghton released her long awaited for album Slumber Party, the album featured the previously released singles Pretty Pretty, Break Me, Physical, Spectrum, Candace, What'd Do?, Why, and Dodged a Bullet. The album features music videos for Get To Lovin', Why, and Dodged a Bullet. In an interview with Xavier from Heard Well Houghton claimed, "All these records I made, produced, wrote, entirely with women."

References

1993 births
Living people
American women singer-songwriters
American women pop singers
Singer-songwriters from Texas
21st-century American women singers
21st-century American singers